Vanamõisa is a village in Haljala Parish, Lääne-Viru County, in northeastern Estonia. It has a population of 51 (as of 31 January 2011).

References 

Villages in Lääne-Viru County